The Quon Dynasty is a Canadian television program that premiered on October 16, 2011, on Citytv. Produced by Anaid Productions, it is a documentary following the Quon family, restaurateurs in Edmonton, Alberta. The family had also appeared on the earlier series The Family Restaurant, which profiled several different family-owned restaurants in the Edmonton area. In Asia, The Quon Dynasty is aired on bio. There is also a Cantonese edition of The Quon Dynasty , which is aired on OMNI, a sister network of Citytv.

The Quon Dynasty was nominated for Best Documentary Series and Best Production Reflecting Cultural Diversity in the Alberta Film and Television Awards.

Synopsis 
The Quons are a Chinese family that live in Edmonton, Alberta. They all run their restaurant, the Lingnan, owned by Kinman Quon. His wife, Amy Quon, owns the fast-food restaurant Chicken For Lunch in Downtown. The Lingnan features many traditional Chinese foods and drinks, and usually gets large numbers of customers. Miles, wants the restaurant to be modern, not old-fashioned. He is loyal to his family and is "the number one son", and he takes that role very seriously. Kinman does not like change, he likes the Lingnan the way it is, because it has been doing fine for sixty years.
Mandy, Amy and Kinman's daughter, lives with her parents and currently works nights at the restaurant. She is dating a man named Ajit, who also works at the Lingnan. She dreams of a life of glamour and fame, and is not completely devoted to the restaurant. Marty, who also lives with Amy and Kinman, is the "slacker", and does not want to work for his desired riches. Amy, their mother, loves her children and takes control of all aspects of their life as much as she can.

Cast 
 Miles Quon: eldest son of Kitman and Amy Quon, manager of Lingnan restaurant
 Amy Quon: over-protective mother of Miles, Mandy, and Marty; wife of Kinman
 Kinman Quon: owner of the Lingnan restaurant, the backbone and stabilizing member of the family
 Mandy Quon: middle child and only daughter of Amy and Kinman, her hobby is skydiving
 Marty Quon: youngest child of Amy and Kinman, his dream is to have an ice cream truck
 Ajit: Mandy's boyfriend and restaurant employee

Nominations and awards 
The Quon Dynasty was nominated for Best Documentary Series and Best Production Reflecting Cultural Diversity in the Alberta Film and Television Awards.

Episodes

See also 
 List of Canadian television series

References

2011 Canadian television series debuts
Citytv original programming
Television shows filmed in Edmonton
2010s Canadian reality television series
Omni Television original programming